The Journal of Moral Education is a quarterly peer-reviewed academic journal covering the study of moral education and development. It was established in 1971 and is published by Taylor & Francis. The editor-in-chief is Kristján Kristjánsson (University of Birmingham). According to the Journal Citation Reports, the journal has a 2017 impact factor of 0.825, ranking it 183rd out of 238 journals in the category "Education & Educational Research".

References

External links

Education journals
Taylor & Francis academic journals
Quarterly journals
Publications established in 1971
English-language journals
Moral psychology